Elle Nash is a British-American editor and author best known for her debut novella Animals Eat Each Other. Nash has stressed the importance of focusing her work on working-class characters and narratives and has criticized mainstream literature for ignoring those narratives.

Work
Nash's debut novella Animals Eat Each Other was published in 2018 by Dzanc Books. In 2021 she released a short story collection, Nudes, through Hobart Pulp. A novella is forthcoming from Clash Books in spring 2022, titled Gag Reflex, which will be published in the form of a LiveJournal. Deliver Me, her second novel, will be published by Unnamed Press in 2023.

Nash also works as an editor, and is co-founder of the literary magazine Witch Craft Magazine.

Bibliography
Animals Eat Each Other (2018)
Nudes (2021)
Gag Reflex (2022)
Deliver Me (2023)

References

External links
 

AGENCY OVER ANYTHING ELSE: TALKING WITH ELLE NASH

American writers
Year of birth missing (living people)
Living people
21st-century American writers
American short story writers